The following is a list of properties owned by Unibail-Rodamco-Westfield, a European commercial real estate company with assets in Europe and North America. Their portfolio includes a number of Westfield-branded shopping centres in the United Kingdom and United States that were originally owned by the Westfield Group, and spun-off into the Westfield Corporation in 2014 before merging with Unibail-Rodamco in 2018. From September 2019, Unibail-Rodamco-Westfield will introduce the Westfield brand to eight operating flagship properties with two properties under development.

Europe

Austria
 Donauzentrum
 Shopping City Süd

Czech Republic
 Centrum Chodov, rebranded to Westfield Chodov in 2019
 Centrum Černý Most, located in the Černý Most district of Prague
 Metropole Zličín just south of Zličín
 Bubny (Shopping Centre) planned to open after 2023 just east of Praha–Bubny railway station

Denmark
 Fisketorvet

France
 Aéroville
 Carrousel du Louvre
 Carré Sénart - Westfield Carré Sénart
 Cnit Paris La Défense
Westfield Euralille
 Galilée
 Les Quatre Temps - Westfield Les Quatre Temps
Forum Les Halles - Westfield Forum Les Halles
 Lyon Confluence
 Parly 2 - Westfield Parly 2
 Sextant
 So Ouest
 Tour Ariane
 Tour Oxygène
 Tour Part-Dieu
 Ulis 2
 Vélizy 2 - Westfield Vélizy 2
 7 Adenauer

Germany 

 Breuningerland Ludwigsburg - managed asset
 Breuningerland Sindelfingen - managed asset
 CentrO
 Die Mitte- managed asset
 Düsseldorf Arcaden- managed asset
 Forum Steglitz- managed asset
 Gera Arcaden
 Gropius Passagen
 Höfe am Brühl
 Köln Arcaden - managed asset
 Leine-Center Laatzen - managed asset
 Minto
 Neukölln Arcaden - managed asset
 Nordwestzentrum - managed asset
 Palais Vest
 Pasing Arcaden
 Paunsdorf Center
 Riem Arcaden - managed asset
 Ruhr Park
 Spandau Arcaden - managed asset
 Schönhauser Allee Arcaden - managed asset
 Westfield Hamburg-Überseequartier
 Wilma - managed asset

Netherlands
 Stadshart Amstelveen
 Citymall Almere
 Stadshart Zoetermeer
 Westfield Mall of the Netherlands Leidschendam

Poland
 Galeria Mokotów
 Arkadia - Westfield Arkadia
 Wroclavia

Slovakia
Aupark Bratislava

Spain
 Bonaire
 Equinoccio
 Garbera (in development)
 La Vaguada
 Parquesur
 Splau
 Westfield Glòries
 Westfield La Maquinista

Sweden
 Mall of Scandinavia - Westfield Mall of Scandinavia
 Nacka Forum
 Täby centrum

United Kingdom
 Westfield London
 Westfield Stratford City
 Whitgift Centre

North America

United States
In April 2022, Unibail-Rodamco-Westfield announced their plan to sell all 24 malls in the United States within 2 years.

California
 Westfield Century City
 Westfield Culver City
 Westfield Fashion Square
 Westfield Galleria at Roseville
 Westfield Mission Valley
 Westfield Oakridge
 Westfield Plaza Bonita
 Westfield San Francisco Centre
 Westfield Topanga & The Village
 Westfield Valencia Town Center
 Westfield Valley Fair
 Westfield UTC

Florida
 Westfield Brandon

Illinois
 Westfield Old Orchard

Maryland
 Westfield Annapolis
 Westfield Montgomery
 Westfield Wheaton

New Jersey
 Westfield Garden State Plaza

New York
 Westfield World Trade Center

Washington
 Westfield Southcenter

Airports
 Los Angeles International
 Chicago O'Hare International
 JFK International
 Newark Liberty International
 Miami International
 Orlando International

See also
 List of shopping malls in Austria
 List of shopping malls in the Czech Republic
 List of shopping malls in Denmark
 List of shopping malls in France
 List of shopping centres in Sweden
 List of shopping centres in the United Kingdom
 List of shopping malls in the United States

Notes
  The property is managed by Unibail-Rodamco-Westfield, but owned by the Port Authority of New York and New Jersey.
  The property is managed by Unibail-Rodamco-Westfield, but owned by the Metropolitan Transportation Authority.

References

Unibail-Rodamco-Westfield